Alexis Hombrecher (born January 29, 1971) is a German born former professional tennis player from the United States.

Biography
Hombrecher, who comes from Wertheim, moved from West Germany in 1983 to the United States, at the age of 12. He settled in Northern California, where he was the top ranked junior player in 1988. As a freshman in 1989-90, he played varsity tennis at Stanford University. Known for unorthodox but powerful serve, he reached as high as the top five in the national 18s rankings and won the 1989 USTA National 18s Hardcourt Championships.

In the early 1990s, Hombrecher competed professionally on the ATP Tour and Challenger Series circuits. He made a total of six main draw appearances at ATP Tour level, across 1990 and 1991. His best result came as a wildcard at the 1990 Prudential-Bache Securities Classic, held in Orlando He defeated David Engel in the first round, then received a walkover win against Aaron Krickstein to advance to the quarter-final, which he lost to David Pate. In doubles he made the semi-finals once, at the 1990 Riklis Classic in Tel Aviv, with Gilad Bloom. Other doubles partners on the ATP Tour included Todd Martin and MaliVai Washington. It was with Washington that he made his only Grand Slam appearance, the men's doubles at the 1990 US Open. He won the Thessaloniki Challenger tournament in 1990 and played in the singles draw at the 1991 Lipton International Players Championships, a top tier event now known as the Miami Masters.

Challenger titles

Doubles: (1)

References

External links
 
 

1971 births
Living people
American male tennis players
Stanford Cardinal men's tennis players
Tennis people from California
People from Wertheim am Main
Sportspeople from Stuttgart (region)
German emigrants to the United States